HispanTV is an Iranian Spanish language news channel operated by IRIB, Iran's state-controlled broadcaster. It began broadcasting in December 2011.

HispanTV's programming has been distributed in Venezuela, Spain, Argentina, Cuba and other countries worldwide and is intended to reinforce ties between Iran and Latin American states such as Venezuela, Bolivia, Chile, Ecuador, Peru, Colombia, Nicaragua, and Mexico as well as to counter what the Iranian government sees as unfair coverage in Western media. The channel is similar to Press TV, an English language news channel and Al-Alam an Arabic satellite TV station also owned by the Iranian state, which claim to provide "accurate and unbiased coverage of the world and the Middle East events as they unfold."

HispanTV has foreign journalists from Argentina, Chile, Honduras, Mexico, Nicaragua, Russia, Spain, and Venezuela. It also has journalists from Iran who speak Spanish.

Goals 

The primary goal of HispanTV is to provide a complete platform of multimedia services to Hispanophone Latin America, Latin-American citizens of Iranian descent, Hispanics of the United States, Muslim minorities of the Hispanophone world, and Spanish-speaking foreign residents in Iran, offering an opportunity for cultural exchange through television and web broadcasts.

TV programs

International reporters

Controversy

Sanctions
In July 2013, HispanTV and other Iranian channels were removed from several European and American satellites. HispanTV is no longer aired in Spain as Spain is a member of the EU and HispanTV now exclusively broadcasts in Hispanic America. HispanTV "tried to bypass sanctions by providing live feeds of its networks through YouTube". HispanTV's YouTube channel has now been blocked due to pressure to Google by the ADL.

Antisemitism allegations
The Anti-Defamation League has stated that "HispanTV regularly broadcasts anti-Semitic and anti-Zionist conspiracy theories" and that Iran's "influence in Latin America has been a strong feature of the Iranian government’s foreign policy in the last decade, and HispanTV serves as a platform to spread Tehran’s conspiracy theories, Holocaust denial and anti-Semitism". HispanTV claimed that the COVID-19 pandemic "is the result of a Zionist plot...This virus serves Zionism's goals to decrease the number of people in the world and prevent it from increasing."

According to the Antisemitism in Venezuela 2013 report by the Venezuelan Confederation of Israelite Associations (CAIV) which focuses on the issue of antisemitism in Venezuela, "distorted news, omissions and false accusations" of Israel originate from Iranian media in Latin America, especially from HispanTV. Such "distorted news" is then repeated by the Russia's RT and Cuba's Prensa Latina, and Venezuela's state media, including SIBCI, AVN, TeleSUR, Venezolana de Televisión (VTV), Alba TV, La Radio del Sur, Radio Nacional de Venezuela (RNV), YVKE Mundial, Correo del Orinoco and Ciudad CCS.

The documentary, based on a conspiracy theory, Plan Andinia: A New Jewish State ?, by Asela Villar, suggests Israël is slowly planning to invade Patagonia. It is aired on Real Stories network, belonging to Little Dot Studios and All3Media.

References

External links

2011 establishments in Iran
Islamic Republic of Iran Broadcasting
Television channels and stations established in 2011
Spanish-language television networks
Mass media in Tehran
Foreign relations of Iran
Conspiracist media